Peter Lawrence is an American politician who served as a member of the New York State Assembly from 2015 to 2021. A Republican, he represented  Hilton, Spencerport and Greece in Monroe County.

Career 
A native of Monroe County, Lawrence formerly served as an officer with the New York State Police before retiring to accept a nomination from President George W. Bush as a United States Marshal, in which he would serve from 2002 to 2010. Lawrence also has served as a wrestling coach for SUNY Brockport, and as a board member for various other organizations.

In 2014, Assemblyman Bill Reilich opted not to seek re-election, and Lawrence was nominated by Republicans to replace him. He easily won election with nearly 68% of the vote.

For more than 30 years, Lawrence has served as a board member for the New York Law Enforcement Corporation. He has also been the assistant coach for the SUNY Brockport wrestling team.

References

External links
New York State Assemblyman Peter Lawrence official site

Living people
Republican Party members of the New York State Assembly
Politicians from Rochester, New York
21st-century American politicians
1950 births